The hazel-fronted pygmy tyrant (Pseudotriccus simplex) is a species of bird in the family Tyrannidae. It is found in Bolivia and Peru. Its natural habitat is subtropical or tropical moist montane forests.

References

hazel-fronted pygmy tyrant
Birds of the Peruvian Andes
Birds of the Bolivian Andes
hazel-fronted pygmy tyrant
Taxonomy articles created by Polbot